Isi Uzo is a Local Government Area of Enugu State, Nigeria bordering Benue State and Ebonyi State. Its headquarters are in the town of Ikem.The other towns are: Eha Amufu (where the Federal College of Education is located), Neke, Mbu, and Umualor.
Isi-Uzo is a constituent of Enugu East Senatorial Zone. It has an area of 877 km² and a population of 148,415 at the 2006 census.

The postal code of the area is 412.

Economy:

The natives are mostly farmers and petty traders. There are also claims that the area sits on large deposits of crude oil and gas but currently rely on agriculture.

Religion:

The natives are majority Christians but there are still those who practice Traditional religion. IsiUzo towns of Ikem, Neke and Eha Amufu have a tradition of Odo worship. With the Igbo Etiti towns of Ohodo, Ukehe and Aku, they make up the Igbo-Odo subculture of Nsukka. The Odo is a masquerade, physically but represents a deity who affords the living a chance to commune with their dead in line with the Igbo traditional belief in reincarnation. Dr Ralph Ede Okwor writes in his book, Ikem Diaspora that "the Odo masquerade is usually and praisingly addressed as 'Odomangala', that is, 'Odo, Muo Ngala', 'a spirit of pride', 'a proud spirit', or 'a spirit that instils pride in the people it protects' indicating that as long as it (Odo) exists, people will always feel proud, happy, and confident of their security". The Odo appears once in two years, and has a masquerade cult into which young adults are initiated. Also, the Odo may walk the town unclad, and those uninitiated are forbidden to stay out on such nights. Such traditions have often caused misunderstanding between the Christians and the adherents of traditional religion.

Notable Persons:
Ani Sylvester Chijioke, son of Padodo David Ani, A well known person who was born and raised in Funtua Katsina state. Chijioke finished his university study at Regional Maritime University at the age of 19, currently living in Ghana was one of the most successful person from Eha-Mufu.

Professor Hilary Odo Edeoga
Hilary Odo Edeoga is the 4th Vice-Chancellor, Michael Okpara University of Agriculture, Umudike and a Professor of Plant Taxonomy and Cytogenetics. He was the Commissioner of Agriculture and Natural Resources, Enugu State (2007 - 2009) and a Senior Research Adviser, Shell Petroleum Development Company Nig. Ltd., Port Harcourt (2006 - 2007) and a Former Deputy Vice-Chancellor, Michael Okpara University of Agriculture, Umudike (2001 - 2005). He has also been the Dean of Post Graduate School (2002 - 2003) and former Head, Department of Biological Sciences, Michael Okpara University of Agriculture, Umudike (2000 - 2001). Prior to his appointment as Vice-Chancellor, he was the Dean, College of Natural and Applied Sciences, Michael Okpara University of Agriculture, Umudike (2009 - 2011). Prof. Edeoga was a Senior Lecturer in the former Edo (Bendel) State University, Ekpoma (now Ambrose Alli University) from 1988 - 1999.
Prof. H. O. Edeoga has been cited in the 2001 edition of Marquis "Who is Who in World." He has also been cited in the "Who is Who in Nigeria" (2003 and 2010 editions).
Professor Edeoga was born into the family of Chief and Mrs Edeoga Ogenyi Eze of Amede, Eha-Amufu, Isi-Uzo LGA, Enugu State and is happily married to Mrs Gina Ibizugbe Edeoga. The marriage is blessed with three lovely children, Izu, Nnenna and Ogonna.

Hon Ugwu Remigeus Nwabueze
Honorable Ugwu Remigeus Nwabueze is the first speaker of the Isi uzo LGA and from Umualor 
He also served as He served as Special Assistant to the Governor of Enugu State under HE Sullivan Chime

Hon Augustine Nnamani

Honourable Augustine Nnamani is the current State Chairman, Peoples Democratic Party (PDP), Enugu chapter, serving a second consecutive term in office. He was previously Chairman of Isi Uzo Local Government Area.

Hon Kingsley Ebenyi
Honorable Member representing Enugu East in the 7th National Assembly. He then became Ambassador of the Federal Republic of Nigeria to the Kingdom of Spain and the Vatican.

Hon Ifeanyi Odoziobodo 
Hon Ifeanyi hails from umualor. He is a senior lecturer in the Department of Political science in Enugu State University of science and technology. He served as Special Assistant to the Governor of Enugu State on Labor Matters. He's also an author and a public affairs analyst.

Area of Concern in Isi Uzo

There is a growing emphasis on the part which Community Based Organizations can play to ensure a true and sustainable development in this area and welfare of the people in general. Although  some scholars have suggested the shift of focus from the government to individual character in dealing with developmental issues-to bottom up strategies  of Community Based  Organizations as an effective means of rural development. This will encourage the efforts of rural dwellers who are members of Community Based Organizations, as well as indicates those strategies that are effective as a means of achieving good results in rural development. Government and other agencies involved in developmental activities with respect to strategies that can be adopted when assisting communities in their areas.

References

Local Government Areas in Enugu State
Local Government Areas in Igboland